Josef Hilgartner was an Austrian luger who competed in the early 1970s. A natural track luger, he won the bronze medal in the men's doubles event at the 1970 FIL European Luge Natural Track Championships in Kapfenberg, Austria.

References
Natural track European Championships results 1970-2006.

Austrian male lugers
Possibly living people
Year of birth missing